The Victorian Railways (VR), trading from 1974 as VicRail, was the state-owned operator of most rail transport in the Australian state of Victoria from 1859 to 1983. The first railways in Victoria were private companies, but when these companies failed or defaulted, the Victorian Railways was established to take over their operations. However, the railways also operated up to five  narrow gauge lines between 1898 and 1962, and a  line between Albury and Melbourne from 1961.

History

Formation
A Department of Railways was created in 1856 with the first appointment of staff. British engineer, George Christian Darbyshire was made first Engineer-in-Chief in 1857, and steered all railway construction work until his replacement by Thomas Higginbotham in 1860. In late 1876, New York consulting engineer Walton Evans arranged the supply of two 4-4-0 locomotives manufactured by the Rogers Locomotive Works of New Jersey, USA to the Victorian Railways.

Because of political turmoil in the Victorian Government, Higginbotham was one of 137 officials removed from office on Black Wednesday on 8 January 1878 when the Government was denied supply. He, like a number of other senior officers, was not reappointed. Robert Watson then took over as Engineer-in-Chief. But in 1880, a new Ministry expressed a wish to redress the injustice by re-instating Higginbotham. However, at the sudden death of Higginbotham in 1880, William Elsdon took over for two years before his retirement in 1882, and Watson then returned to his former position as Engineer-in-Chief, which he held up to the time of his death.

On 1 November 1883, assent was given to the Victorian Railways Commissioners Act 1883, 47 Vic., No.767, to construct, maintain and manage the state's railways. The staff of the Department of Railways came under the authority of the Railway Commissioners, which became commonly known as Victorian Railways. The elaborate headquarters at 67 Spencer Street were opened in 1893.

Growth

Victorian Railways grew to service all parts of the state, even extending some lines into New South Wales under the 1922 Border Railways Act. In the late 19th century, the railways became something of a political football with politicians demanding new lines to be built in places where traffic levels never justified it. In 1864, there was just 254 miles (409 km) of railway. The system expanded rapidly to reach 2,900 route miles (4,670 km) by 1891 and to its greatest extent of 4,755 route miles (7652 km) in 1939. The result was that by the beginning of the 20th century, no Victorian (apart from those in the mountain regions) was more than 25 miles (42 km) from a railway line. The period from the end of the 1930s saw a slow decline in route mileage as unprofitable branches were closed.

Conversion of the Melbourne suburban system to electric operation commenced in 1919 and was completed by 1930, creating what was claimed at the time to be the world's largest electric suburban rail system. 1937 saw the introduction of the streamlined Spirit of Progress passenger train, with air conditioning and all steel carriage construction. Diesel power was introduced in 1951 with ten F-class diesel-electric shunting locomotives, followed by B-class mainline diesel-electric locomotives in 1952/53. A standard gauge line connecting to the New South Wales system was constructed in 1961 allowing through trains to operate between Melbourne and Sydney, Australia's two largest cities, for the first time. The last steam locomotive was withdrawn in 1972.

Demise
In May 1973, the Railways (Amendment) Act 1972 passed the management of the Railways from the Victorian Railways Commissioners to a Victorian Railways Board. In 1974, the Victorian Railways was rebranded as VicRail, but the royal blue and gold livery used on rolling stock was retained until 1981.

In 1983, VicRail was divided into two—the State Transport Authority taking responsibility for the provision of country rail and road, passenger and freight services, and the Metropolitan Transit Authority taking over suburban passenger operations.

The State Transport Authority traded under the V/Line name, while the Metropolitan Transit Authority used that name until the Public Transport Corporation ("The Met") was formed in 1989. Between 1996 and 1999, V/Line and The Met were privatised. V/Line Passenger was franchised to National Express, returning to government ownership in 2002. The V/Line Freight division was sold to Freight Victoria and is now owned by Pacific National. The infrastructure is now managed by VicTrack with the interstate rail freight infrastructure leased to the Australian Rail Track Corporation. Metro Trains Melbourne now operates the suburban railway network.

Management

When first formed in 1857, the management of the Railways Department was initially vested in the President of the Board of Land and Works, this situation remaining until 1884. With the passing of the Victorian Railways Commissioners Act 1883, a board of four commissioners was put in charge, responsible to the Minister of Railways (the Minister of Transport from 1935 onwards).

The Chairman of Commissioners of the Victorian Railways were:

Richard Speight: 1883 to 1892
Richard Hodge Francis: 1892 to 1894
James Syder: 1894 to 1896
John Mathieson: 1896 to 1901
William Francis Joseph Fitzpatrick: 1901 to 1903
Thomas James Tait: 1903 to 1910
William Francis Joseph Fitzpatrick: 1910 to 1915
Charles Ernest Norman: 1915 to 1920
Harold Winthrop Clapp: 1920 to 1939
Norman Charles Harris: 1940 to 1950
Robert George Wishart: 1950 to 1955
Edgar Henry Brownbill: 1956 to 1967
George Frederick Brown: 1967 to 1973

After the Bland Report of 1972, in May 1973 the Railways (Amendment) Act 1972 passed the management of the Railways from the Victorian Railways Commissioners to a Victorian Railways Board. The board could have up to seven members, with six being initially appointed. This remained until 1983 when the board was discontinued under the Transport Act 1983.

Fleet

The Victorian Railways operated a wide variety of locomotives and rolling stock to provide passenger and goods services. This included equipment acquired from the private companies that built the first railways in Victoria. The majority was the fleet was broad gauge, with a specialised fleet used on the narrow gauge lines. In later years, gauge conversion was used to place stock from the main VR fleet onto standard gauge.

In 1936, the company owned 590 locomotives, 38 railcars, 819 coaches, 716 brake vans and 20.945 goods wagons.

The first locomotives used in the state were small steam locomotives, the majority being imported from the United Kingdom, with later years seeing larger units being built locally. Electric locomotives were acquired with the electrification of the suburban railways, with more powerful units acquired when the mainline to Traralgon was electrified. Dieselisation occurred from 1951, but the B class of 1952 revolutionised main line operations. Apart from the F class shunters, Clyde Engineering had a monopoly on Victorian diesel-electric locomotives, as the Australian licensee of General Motors EMD engines and traction motors, fitting them into locally designed bodies.

Early passenger services were operated with 4 and 6 wheeled "dogbox" passenger carriages, but larger bogie rollingstock started to appear from the turn of the century. On the Melbourne suburban network electric multiple units were introduced speeding up services. Experiments were also made with various diesel and petrol railcars for use on smaller branch lines. By the late 1970s, country passenger services were run down, and older wooden rolling stock was now approaching their use by date. As a result, the New Deal saw modern steel carriages introduced from 1981.

Early wagons were built on four wheeled under frames, but from 1871 bogie vehicles begun to appear. The last four wheeled open wagons were built in 1958, but were not scrapped in large numbers until the 1980s when new bogie wagons replaced them. By 1987, the bogie wagon fleet numbered 5000.

When the Victorian Railways (now known as VicRail) was divided into two in 1983, the Metropolitan Transit Authority received the suburban electric multiple unit fleet, while the State Transport Authority took responsibility for remainder for the provision of country passenger and freight services.

Operational branches

The Victorian Railways was divided up into a number of branches, each with a set of responsibilities. These branches were reorganised a number of times, in 1962 they were:

 Secretaries: headed by the Secretary for Railways, dealt with policy, administration, transport regulation and legal matters.
 Rolling Stock: headed by the Chief Mechanical Engineer, was responsible for design, construction, operation, and maintenance of all locomotives and rolling stock.
 Way and Works: headed by the Chief Civil Engineer, it constructed and maintained all fixed infrastructure such as track, bridges, stations, signalling and safeworking.
 Traffic: headed by the Chief Traffic Manager, it operated all goods and passenger services both on rail and road.
 Electrical Engineering: headed by the Chief Electrical Engineer, it managed the suburban railway electrification system, as well as power supply to stations.
 Accountancy: headed by the Controller of Accounts, it recorded all payments, prepared budgets, conducted audits, and paid salaries and wages to employees
 Commercial: headed by the Chief Commercial Manager, it set goods rates and passenger fares, solicited for new traffic to rail, and took action against by-laws offenders.
 Stores: headed by the Controller of Stores, it received all incoming stores and materials, and controlled the railway printing works.
 Refreshment Services:  headed by the Superintendent of Refreshment Services, it controlled food and bookstore services at station, managed advertising at stations, as well as the railway bakery, butchery, poultry farm and laundry.

Visual identification

For most of the 20th century, the colours of royal blue and gold were the distinctive feature of the Victorian Railways. It was first introduced on the Spirit of Progress express train in 1937 along with the winged "VR" logo, and was refined to the final form with the arrival of the B class diesel electric locomotives in 1952. The revised logo was inspired by that of the Erie Railroad in the United States.

While the Spirit of Progress carriages wore the royal blue and gold striping, the remainder of the passenger fleet wore a more plain red livery. Additional carriages did not appear in the blue and gold until the 1954 Royal Tour by HM Queen Elizabeth II. Freight stock was painted in a slightly different red / brown with only identifying lettering painted in white on the side.

With the coming of the standard gauge line into Victoria in 1961, the Victorian Railways held a competition to find a "symbol, sign or slogan" to be carried on new freight vehicles for the line. The winner was an 18-year-old art student from Bentleigh, with the logo being a stylised VR with arrowheads on either end. By the 1970s most bogie vehicles wore the logo, until May 1983 pending the launch of V/Line.

In 1974, the Victorian Railways was rebranded as VicRail, with a new logo unveiled on 12 April 1976, but the royal blue and gold image was retained until 1981, when the orange and silver "teacup" scheme was launched on locomotives, Comeng trains, and passenger carriages. This was the last livery, with V/Line launched in August 1983 with a "stylised capital lettered logo with the V and the L split by a deep slashing stroke".

Named trains
The Victorian Railways operated a number of named passenger trains, including the:

Fruit Flyer
Geelong Flier
Great Northern Limited
The Overland
The Boat Train
Spirit of Progress
The Gippslander
Intercapital Daylight
Mildura Sunlight
Southern Aurora
The Northerner
The Vinelander
The West Coaster

The railways also operated a number of specialist trains that were used to bring services to rural and isolated populations. These included:
Better Farming Train
Reso Train
Train of Knowledge

Other functions
From 1888, the Victorian Railways began to take on a role in tourism, operating the Victorian Government Tourist Bureau until it was taken over by the state government in 1959. In connection with their role of promoting tourism, the railways ran three guesthouses/ski lodges which were taken over from previous operators: the Mount Buffalo Chalet from (1925–1985), the Feathertop Bungalow (1927–1939) and Hotham Heights (1934–1951).

In 1911, the Victorian Railways Commissioners assumed responsibility for the State Coal Mine at Wonthaggi from the Mines Department. VR also operated Newport Power Stations A and B.

Other operations included railway refreshment services, road motor services for passengers, and motor transport services for goods. The railways also operated two tram routes in Melbourne, the Electric Street Railways; the St Kilda to Brighton Beach Street Railway ( gauge) from 1906 until 1959 and the Sandringham to Black Rock tramway from 1919 to 1956.

Publications
From 1930 until 1973, Victorian Railways News Letter was the Victorian Railways' inhouse journal. It was renamed  Victorian Rail Ways in June 1973 and  VicRail News in March 1981.

References
Public Record Office Victoria - Victorian Railways

External links
 

Former government railways of Australia
Government railway authorities of Australia
Railway companies established in 1859
Railway companies disestablished in 1983
Rail transport in Victoria (Australia)
1859 establishments in Australia
1983 disestablishments in Australia
5 ft 3 in gauge railways in Australia
Former government agencies of Victoria (Australia)